Route 101 is a north-south highway in northwestern Quebec. The highway begins at Route 111 in Macamic and ends at Témiscaming, a town bordering with Thorne, Ontario on the Ottawa River. It continues south as Highway 63 to North Bay, Ontario.

Municipalities along Route 101

 Témiscaming
 Laniel
 Saint-Édouard-de-Fabre
 Ville-Marie
 Duhamel-Ouest
 Saint-Bruno-de-Guigues
 Notre-Dame-du-Nord
 Nédélec
 Rémigny
 Rouyn-Noranda
 Sainte-Germaine-Boulé
 Taschereau
 Poularies
 Macamic

Major intersections

See also
 List of Quebec provincial highways

References

External links 

 Official Transport Quebec Road Map (Courtesy of the Quebec Ministry of Transportation) 
 Route 101 on Google Maps

101
Transport in Rouyn-Noranda